Buzhok is a village (selo) in Zolochiv Raion, Lviv Oblast, in western Ukraine. It belongs to Zolochiv urban hromada, one of the hromadas of Ukraine. The village is about 14.5 kilometers southeast of Zolochiv. Its population is 529 people. The village refers to Bilokaminskoyi village council. 

The first registers dated from 1781.

References 

 
 weather.in.ua
Villages in Zolochiv Raion, Lviv Oblast